Stanislav Galiev (born 17 January 1992) is a Russian professional ice hockey right winger for Ak Bars Kazan of the Kontinental Hockey League (KHL). He previously played for the Washington Capitals of the National Hockey League (NHL).

Playing career
As a youth, Galiev played in the 2005 Quebec International Pee-Wee Hockey Tournament with a team from Moscow.

He played junior ice hockey with the Saint John Sea Dogs of the  Quebec Major Junior Hockey League. He was drafted by the Washington Capitals in the 3rd round (86th overall) of the 2010 NHL Entry Draft. Galiev made his NHL debut for the Capitals in the 2014–15 season, on April 8, 2015 against the Boston Bruins and scored his first NHL goal on April 11, 2015 against the New York Rangers in the last game of the regular season.

After five seasons within the Capitals organization and unable to make an impression in the NHL, Galiev left as a free agent and returned to Russia to sign a two-year contract with Ak Bars Kazan of the KHL on July 14, 2017.

Galiev remained with Ak Bars for four seasons, before leaving the club as a free agent at the conclusion of the 2020–21 season. He was signed to a lucrative two-year contract with HC Dynamo Moscow on 1 May 2021.

After a lone season with Dynamo Moscow, Galiev was returned by Dynamo to former club Ak Bars Kazan in a trade for Jordan Weal on 1 July 2022.

International play

 

Galiev played with the Russian junior team at the 2009 Ivan Hlinka Memorial Tournament, helping capture a silver medal.

On 23 January 2022, Galiev was named to the roster to represent Russian Olympic Committee athletes at the 2022 Winter Olympics.

Career statistics

Regular season and playoffs

International

Awards and honours

References

External links

1992 births
Ak Bars Kazan players
HC Dynamo Moscow players
Hershey Bears players
Indiana Ice players
Living people
Reading Royals players
Russian ice hockey right wingers
Saint John Sea Dogs players
Tatar people of Russia
Washington Capitals draft picks
Washington Capitals players
Ice hockey players at the 2022 Winter Olympics
Medalists at the 2022 Winter Olympics
Olympic silver medalists for the Russian Olympic Committee athletes
Olympic medalists in ice hockey
Olympic ice hockey players of Russia